Tomoyuki Saito   is a Japanese mixed martial artist. He competed in the Bantamweight division.

Mixed martial arts record

|-
| Loss
| align=center| 2-3-4
| Mamoru Okochi
| Submission (armbar)
| Shooto - Shooto
| 
| align=center| 1
| align=center| 2:43
| Tokyo, Japan
| 
|-
| Win
| align=center| 2-2-4
| Mamoru Okochi
| Submission (rear-naked choke)
| Shooto - Shooto
| 
| align=center| 2
| align=center| 0:00
| Tokyo, Japan
| 
|-
| Draw
| align=center| 1-2-4
| Hiroaki Matsutani
| Draw
| Shooto - Shooto
| 
| align=center| 3
| align=center| 3:00
| Tokyo, Japan
| 
|-
| Draw
| align=center| 1-2-3
| Suguru Shigeno
| Draw
| Shooto - Shooto
| 
| align=center| 3
| align=center| 3:00
| Tokyo, Japan
| 
|-
| Loss
| align=center| 1-2-2
| Hiroyuki Kanno
| Decision (unanimous)
| Shooto - Shooto
| 
| align=center| 3
| align=center| 3:00
| Tokyo, Japan
| 
|-
| Loss
| align=center| 1-1-2
| Noboru Asahi
| Submission (armbar)
| Shooto - Shooto
| 
| align=center| 1
| align=center| 2:54
| Tokyo, Japan
| 
|-
| Win
| align=center| 1-0-2
| Toshio Ando
| Submission (armbar)
| Shooto - Shooto
| 
| align=center| 1
| align=center| 2:48
| Tokyo, Japan
| 
|-
| Draw
| align=center| 0-0-2
| Suguru Shigeno
| Draw
| Shooto - Shooto
| 
| align=center| 3
| align=center| 3:00
| Tokyo, Japan
| 
|-
| Draw
| align=center| 0-0-1
| Tetsuo Yokoyama
| Draw
| Shooto - Shooto
| 
| align=center| 3
| align=center| 3:00
| Tokyo, Japan
|

See also
List of male mixed martial artists

References

External links
 
 Tomoyuki Saito at mixedmartialarts.com

Japanese male mixed martial artists
Bantamweight mixed martial artists
Living people
Year of birth missing (living people)